Moshirkara Kamuy is an Ainu kamuy (god).  At the command of Kandakoro Kamuy, he is said to have created the earth, shaping it and preparing it for humans to inhabit.  Like Kandakoro Kamuy, he plays little part in Ainu mythology after the creation of the world is complete.

References
Ashkenazy, Michael. Handbook of Japanese Mythology. Santa Barbara, California: ABC-Clio, 2003.
Etter, Carl. Ainu Folklore: Traditions and Culture of the Vanishing Aborigines of Japan. Chicago: Wilcox and Follett, 1949.
Munro, Neil Gordon. Ainu Creed and Cult. New York: Columbia University Press, 1995.

Ainu kamuy